Chyi Yu or Qi Yu (born 17 October 1957) is a Taiwanese singer best known for her 1979 hit, "The Olive Tree" (橄欖樹). She won the 9th Golden Melody Award for Best Female Vocalist Mandarin.
She is the elder sister of singer-songwriter Chyi Chin. She is a religious Buddhist and a vegetarian.

Chyi Yu is a protege of the late Taiwanese composer and songwriter, Li Tai-hsiang. Li wrote the evergreen masterpiece "The Olive Tree," which was released in 1979. Chyi later married Li's younger brother.

Chyi Yu also collaborated with Li Tai-hsiang on a number of her other songs, including "Daylight Avenue" (一条日光大道) "Walking In The Rain" (走在雨中) and "Your Smiling Face" (欢颜). She is also known for tracks such as "Boat Song" (船歌) and covers of folk songs such as Geordie/Tears - Donde Voy/Whoever Finds This, I Love You. Her last Mandopop album Camel-Flying Bird-Fish (骆驼飞鸟鱼) was released in 1997 and she has recently been releasing Buddhist music compilations.

Chyi has worked with international artists such as Dave Matthews (1993, Plaisir D'amour), Suzanne Ciani (1999, turning) and their cooperation album including the title track Turning was Grammy-nominated.(42nd Grammy Award for Best New Age Album）

Discography
1979 橄欖樹 (Chinese debut)
"The Olive Tree", which was based on an English-language poem by Sanmao, was originally written about a small donkey which Sanmao had encountered on a plain in Spain. Li Tai-hsiang had the poem translated to Mandarin by folk singer T.C. Yang, with Sanmao's permission, and wrote the song for Chyi Yu. Yang omitted the donkey, which he felt would not easily connect with Taiwanese music fans. Chyi Yu has stated in an interview that "Every time I sing this song [The Olive Tree], I'm nervous."

1982 祝福 (All songs are composed by Li Tai-hsiang)

1983 你是我所有的回憶 (All songs are composed by Li Tai-hsiang)

1984 有一個人 (Only You I) [This album is all composed by Li Tai-hsiang]

1985 回聲 (collaboration with writer, Sanmao (author) and singer Michelle Pan

1987 Stories (English debut, Producer: Reggie Verghes, ex-producer of Tracy Huang's English album)

1988 Whoever Finds This I Love You (誰撿到這張紙條 我愛你) [MTV shot in Singapore, Malaysia & Thailand]

1988 Paradise Bird

1988 有沒有這種說法

1990 Where Have All The Flowers Gone

1993 藏愛的女人(Love of my life - 5th English album)

1994 齊豫中文個人聲音自傳——敢愛 (Chyi's Voice Biography 1978~1990)

1994 齊豫英文個人聲音自傳——敢夢 (Chyi's Voice Biography 1978~1990)

1996 Chyi's Tears

1997 駱駝‧飛鳥‧魚

1998 天浴 - 慾水 Whispering Steppes (Movie soundtrack album)
1999 C'est La Vie (7th English album)

 
2003 The unheard of Chyi (Live concert album)
CD 1

CD 2

BONUS CD

2003 印象·劉三姐 歌 - 籐纏樹 多謝了 (Concept album produced & only released in Mainland China)
2004 唱經給你聽[壹] -- 順心: 因此更美麗 (Beauty Unveiled) (Buddhism album - Part 1)

2004 唱經給你聽[贰] -- 安心: 發現了勇氣 (Courage Uncovered) (Buddhism album - Part 2)

2004 唱經給你聽[叁] -- 快樂行: 所以變快樂 (Blissfully Happy) (Buddhism album - Part 3)

(The songs marked with * are the short versions included in the same series of album I & II)

2006 唱經給你聽之四·佛心 (Heart) (Buddhism album - Part 4)

2010 The Voice (8th English album - Christianity, Pop & Oldies)

2011 雲端 (Over the Cloud)

2011 佛子行————三十七誦 (The 37 Teachings of Buddha)

2014叩钟偈/准提神咒 
(Morning Bell Gatha, Evening Bell Gatha, Cundhi Bodhisattva Mantra)

2015 八圣吉祥祈请文 (The Verses of the Eight Noble Auspicious Ones)

2017 地藏赞 (Praise For Ksitigarbha Bodhisattva The Bodhisattva  of the Great Vow ）

See also
 Manchu people in Taiwan

References

1958 births
Living people
Taiwanese women singers
Musicians from Taichung
Taiwanese Buddhists
Taiwanese people of Manchu descent
Manchu singers